Political will is defined as "the extent of committed support among key decision makers for a particular policy solution to a particular problem." It is also considered by political scientist Linn Hammergren to be "the slipperiest concept in the policy lexicon." Lack of political will is often blamed for unresolved political issues.

References

Politics